Guru Angad (31 March 1504 – 29 March 1552); Gurmukhi: ਗੁਰੂ ਅੰਗਦ,) was the second of the ten Sikh gurus of Sikhism. After meeting Guru Nanak, the founder of Sikhism, becoming a Sikh, and serving and working with Guru Nanak for many years, Guru Nanak gave Lehna the name Angad ("my own limb"), and chose Angad as the second Sikh Guru.

After the death of Guru Nanak in 1539, Guru Angad led the Sikh tradition. He is remembered in Sikhism for adopting and formalising the Gurmukhi alphabet. He began the process of compiling the hymns of Guru Nanak and contributed 63 Saloks of his own. Instead of his own son, he chose his disciple Amar Das as his successor and the third Guru of Sikhism.

Biography

Early life
Guru Angad was born with birth name of Lehna (also transliterated as Lahina) in village Matte-di-Sarai (now Sarainaga) in the District Sri Muktsar Sahib of Punjab region. He was the son of a small but successful trader named Pheru Mal. His mother's name was Mata Ramo (also known as Mata Sabhirai, Mansa Devi and Daya Kaur). Like all the Sikh Gurus, Lehna came from Khatri caste and specifically the Trehan gotra (clan).

At age 16, Angad married a Khatri girl named Mata Khivi in January 1520. They had two sons (Dasu and Datu) and one or two daughters (Amro and Anokhi), depending on the primary sources. The entire family of his father had left their ancestral village in fear of the invasion of Babur's armies. After this the family settled at Khadur Sahib, a village by the River Beas near what is now Tarn Taran.

Before becoming a disciple of Guru Nanak and following the Sikh way of life as Angad, Lehna was a religious teacher of Khadur who followed goddess Durga. Bhai Lehna in his late 20s sought out Guru Nanak, became his disciple, and displayed deep and loyal service to his Guru for about six to seven years in Kartarpur and renounced the Hindu way of life.

Selection as successor

Several stories in the Sikh tradition describe reasons why Lehna was chosen by Guru Nanak over his own sons as his choice of successor. One of these stories is about a jug which fell into mud, and Guru Nanak asked his sons to pick it up. Guru Nanak's sons would not pick it up because it was too dirty or menial a task. Then he asked Bhai Lehna, who however picked it out of the mud, washed it clean, and presented it to Guru Nanak full of water. Guru Nanak touched him and renamed him Angad (from Ang, or part of the body) and named him as his successor and the second Nanak on 7 September 1539.

After Guru Nanak died on 22 September 1539, Guru Angad unable to bear the separation from Guru Nanak retired into a room in a disciple's house in a state of Vairagya. Baba Buddha later discovered him after a long search and requested him to return for Guruship. The Gurbani uttered at the time Die before the one whom you love, to live after he dies is to live a worthless life in this world. was the first hymn in Guru Granth Sahib by Guru Angad and signifies the pain he felt at the separation from Guru Nanak. Guru Angad later left Kartarpur for the village of Khadur Sahib (near Goindwal Sahib). Post succession, at one point, very few Sikhs accepted Guru Angad as their leader and while the sons of Guru Nanak claimed to be the successors. Guru Angad focused on the teachings of Nanak, and building the community through charitable works such as langar.

Relationship with the Mughal Empire
The second Mughal Emperor of India Humayun visited Guru Angad at around 1540 after Humayun lost the Battle of Kannauj, and thereby the Mughal throne to Sher Shah Suri. According to Sikh hagiographies, when Humayun arrived in Gurdwara Mal Akhara Sahib at Khadur Sahib Guru Angad was sitting and teaching children. The failure to greet the Emperor immediately angered Humayun. Humayun lashed out but the Guru reminded him that the time when you needed to fight when you lost your throne you ran away and did not fight and now you want to attack a person engaged in prayer. In the Sikh texts written more than a century after the event, Guru Angad is said to have blessed the emperor, and reassured him that someday he will regain the throne.

Death and successor
Before his death, Guru Angad, following the example set by Guru Nanak, nominated Guru Amar Das as his successor (The Third Nanak). Amar Das was born into a Hindu family and had been reputed to have gone on some twenty pilgrimages into the Himalayas, to Haridwar on river Ganges. About 1539, on one such Hindu pilgrimage, he met a sadhu, or ascetic, who asked him why he did not have a guru (teacher, spiritual counsellor) and Amar Das decided to get one. On his return, he heard Bibi Amro, the daughter of the Guru Angad who had married his brother's son, singing a hymn by Guru Nanak. Amar Das learnt from her about Guru Angad, and with her help met the second Guru of Sikhism in 1539, adopting Guru Angad as his spiritual Guru, who was much younger than his own age.

Amar Das displayed relentless devotion and service to Guru Angad. Sikh tradition states that he woke up in the early hours to fetch water for Guru Angad's bath, cleaned and cooked for the volunteers with the Guru, as well devoted much time to meditation and prayers in the morning and evening. Guru Angad named Amar Das as his successor in 1552. Guru Angad died on 29 March 1552.

Influence

Gurmukhi script

Guru Angad is credited in the Sikh tradition with the Gurmukhi script, which is now the standard writing script for Punjabi language in India, in contrast to Punjabi language in Pakistan where now a Perso-Arabic script called Shahmukhi is the standard. The original Sikh scriptures and most of the historic Sikh literature have been written in the Gurmukhi script.

Guru Angad standardised and made improvements to the scripts of the region to create the Gurmukhi script. Examples of possible forerunners of the script including at least one hymn written in acrostic form by Guru Nanak, and its earlier history is yet to be fully determined.

He also wrote 62 or 63 Saloks (compositions), which together constitute about one percent of the Guru Granth Sahib, the primary scripture of Sikhism. Rather than contribute hymns, Angad's importance was as a consolidator of Guru Nanak's hymns. Guru Angad would also supervise the writing down of Nanak's hymns by Bhai Paira Mokha and scrutinize the resulting compilation, preparing the way for a Sikh scripture, as well as the beginning of a vernacular Punjabi literature, as tradition holds that he may have also commissioned an account of Guru Nanak's life from earlier disciples. The collection of hymns would also be increasingly important for the expanding community.

Langar and community work
Guru Angad is notable for systematising the institution of langar in all Sikh temple premises, where visitors from near and far could get a free simple meal in a communal seating. He also set the rules and training method for volunteers (sevadars) who operated the kitchen, placing emphasis on treating it as a place of rest and refuge, being always polite and hospitable to all visitors.

Guru Angad visited other places and centres established by Guru Nanak for the preaching of Sikhism. He established new centres and thus strengthened its base.

Mall Akhara

The Guru, being a great patron of wrestling, started a Mall Akhara (wrestling arena) system where physical exercises, martial arts, and wrestling was taught as well as health topics such as staying away from tobacco and other toxic substances. He placed emphasis on keeping the body healthy and exercising daily. 
He founded many such Mall Akharas in many villages including a few in Khandur. Typically the wrestling was done after daily prayers and also included games and light wrestling.

Gallery

See also

Guru Granth Sahib
List of places named after Guru Angad Dev

References

Bibliography
 Harjinder Singh Dilgeer, SIKH HISTORY (in English) in 10 volumes, especially volume 1 (published by Singh Brothers Amritsar, 2009–2011).
 Sikh Gurus, Their Lives and Teachings, K.S. Duggal

External links

First Gurbani by Guru Angad
sikh-history.com

Creators of writing systems
Angad
1552 deaths
1504 births
Punjabi people
Punjab
People from Punjab, India